The Houlgate battery (also called the Battery de Tournebride) was a World War II German artillery battery constructed close to the French village of Houlgate in the Calvados department in the Lower Normandy region. The former fire control post has been turned into an orientation table. The battery is 8 km west of the Mont Canisy battery.

Construction 
The Organisation Todt constructed concrete pits to protect six 155 mm K420 cannons in 1941. Each pit was linked via tunnels to ammunition stores and by telephone to a range-finding post. The Germans aimed to place all the First World War vintage French guns inside H679 casements but by the time of the Normandy landings only two had been completed.

Garrison 
The Houlgate battery was garrisoned by the 3 Company of the 1255 Heeres-Küsten-Artillerie-Abteilung (HKAA) and commanded by Major Fritz Günther.

Operation Sunstar 
The battery was the target of a raid by British commandos of No. 9 Commando in late November 1941. Their attempt to destroy the battery failed.

D-Day and Normandy landings 
Two weeks prior to D-Day, the battery was bombed by B-26 Marauders. Over 500 tons of bombs landed in the vicinity and two guns were made inoperable by the attack. On 5 June the RAF bombed the battery but caused minimal damage. On the morning of 6 June 1944, the battery shelled the Allied landing beach Sword. The officer commanding the Merville battery called in fire from Houlgate onto his own when it was being attacked by paratroopers.

At 0523 on 6 June 1944 the Royal Navy , HMS Roberts engaged the battery from 20,000 yards with her  guns but the 27 rounds fired caused minimal damage. In late June, the bunker was shelled by the 15 inch guns of HMS Erebus.

At the end of June 1944 the Germans evacuated the battery and moved the remaining guns inland for safety.

Operation Frog 
The Houlgate battery was considered a serious threat to the landing beaches and it was initially considered as a target for No. 4 Commando. However, the need for commandos in the immediate vicinity of the landing beaches and the confidence of the RAF and Royal Navy to silence the battery saw this cancelled.

References

External links 

Atlantic Wall
Military history of France during World War II
Military history of Normandy
Fortifications in France